The Swansea.com Stadium (formerly Liberty Stadium) is an all-seated sports stadium and conferencing venue located in the Landore area of Swansea, Wales. The stadium opened in 2005 and was named the Liberty Stadium. It had an opening capacity of 20,750, making it the largest purpose-built venue in Swansea; minor layout changes have since increased this to 21,088. 

It is the home stadium of EFL Championship club Swansea City, who took full operational control of the stadium in 2018, and the Ospreys rugby team. As a result of Swansea City's promotion in 2011, the stadium became the first Premier League ground in Wales.  It is the third largest stadium in Wales – after the Millennium Stadium and the Cardiff City Stadium. In European competitions, the stadium is known as Swansea Stadium due to advertising rules.

History
With Swansea City's Vetch Field, and Ospreys' St Helen's and The Gnoll  no longer being up-to-date venues to play at, and both the Swans and the Ospreys not having the necessary capital to invest into a new stadium, Swansea council and a developer-led consortia submitted a proposal for a sustainable 'bowl' venue for 20,520 seats on a site to the west of the River Tawe on the site of the Morfa Stadium, an athletics stadium owned by the City and County of Swansea council. It was funded by a 355,000 ft retail park on land to the east of the river. The final value of the development was in excess of £50m.

On 10 July 2005, the stadium was opened and became the home to Swansea City and Ospreys. On 23 July 2005, it was officially opened as Swansea City faced Fulham, (then managed by former Swansea player Chris Coleman) in a friendly match. The match ended in a 1–1 draw with the first goal being scored by Fulham's Steed Malbranque. Swansea's Marc Goodfellow scored during the game to level the match. The first league game was held on 6 August, with Swansea defeating Tranmere Rovers through a single goal by debutant Adebayo Akinfenwa.

Before a league match between Swansea City and Oldham Athletic in October 2005, a statue of Ivor Allchurch (1929–1997) was unveiled to commemorate the Swansea-born star who during two spells for the club scored a record 164 goals in 445 appearances.

The first capacity crowd recorded at Liberty Stadium was on the 1 November 2006 when The Ospreys beat Australia A 24–16. The stadium has hosted multiple Wales football internationals, listed below.

Seating at Liberty Stadium is often sold out during Swansea City football matches.  Swansea City have expressed a desire to have the capacity of the stadium increased and have held talks with Swansea Council during the 2011–2012 season for the future expansion of the Liberty Stadium which would be completed in a number of phases beginning with expansion or redevelopment of the east stand. Plans for a new McDonald's fast food restaurant to be opened near the stadium threw expansion plans into doubt. However, the planning application was withdrawn.

In December 2013, it was reported by BBC News that the European Commission had requested details of the funding of the stadium, as part of a wider inquiry into state aid for sports clubs.

At the start of the 2014–15 Premier League season, a number of changes were made to the stadium. These included two new 'Jumbotron' screens inside the north and south stands, measuring approximately 200 inches. Due to sponsorship by LG all televisions in food outlets and concourse were replaced by 50" LG TV screens and the south stand renamed The LG Stand. New advertising boards with a crowd facing side were also added.

Expansions planned would expand the stadium to 33,000, with another expansion upgrading the stadium to above the 40,000 mark. This would make Wales national football matches a possibility.

In July 2018, Swansea City AFC took full ownership of the stadium, after reaching an agreement with Swansea City Council. It was agreed that Ospreys RFC could continue to share the stadium.

Naming

During its construction, a variety of names were suggested for it: most commonly used was "White Rock" stadium (after the copper works of the same name which existed on the site historically). However "White Rock" was only used as a temporary name during its construction and when work was finished, the name was dropped and the stadium owners began looking for sponsors for the stadium. While sponsors were being searched for, it was called "New Stadium Swansea". On 18 October 2005, Swansea-based developers Liberty Properties Plc won the naming rights to call it "Liberty Stadium". In UEFA matches, it is called Swansea Stadium due to UEFA regulations on sponsorship.  On 8 May 2015 the stadium was renamed The Katie Phillips Stadium for one night only. On 9 August 2021, the stadium was renamed the Swansea.com stadium following a 10-year contract being agreed with Swansea.com, a business which shares director Martin Morgan with Swansea City.

International fixtures

The ground has also hosted eight Wales international football fixtures. The first was the first Wales match in Swansea for 17 years, and saw local player John Hartson captain the team for the first time, in a goalless draw against Slovenia. The first competitive game and first victory was a 2–0 win over Switzerland in UEFA Euro 2012 qualification on 7 October 2011. The most recent game was a goalless draw against the United States on 12 November 2020, the first Wales game at the venue for seven years.

The results were as follows:

Other uses

Concerts

Politics
In April 2014, the stadium held a UK Independence Party conference.

Statistics and average attendances
Stadium capacity: 21,088
Record attendance: 20,999 vs Cardiff Blues 1 May 2016
First international game held: Wales v Slovenia, 17 August 2005.
Average attendances are for home league matches only.

Gallery

See also
 List of stadia in Wales by capacity
 List of Premier League stadiums
 List of football stadiums in England

References

External links

 
 Swansea City Council
 Swansea City AFC
 Ospreys Regional Rugby Team

Football venues in Wales
Rugby union stadiums in Wales
Swansea City A.F.C.
Ospreys (rugby union)
Sports venues in Swansea
Stadiums in Swansea
Buildings and structures in Swansea
Sports venues completed in 2005
Premier League venues
English Football League venues